Demokratizatsiya may refer to:
Demokratizatsiya (journal), a journal devoted to changes in late Soviet Union and post-Soviet states
Demokratizatsiya (Soviet Union), a slogan for introduction of democratic elements in the CPSU and Soviet Union

See also
Democratization